Glen Campbell: The Goodbye Tour was the final concert tour by Glen Campbell, showcasing his album, Ghost on the Canvas. The tour started on August 31, 2011 in Toronto and finished on November 30, 2012 in Napa.

Background
Campbell was supported on tour by roots band Instant People, which includes all three of his children with current wife Kim, sons Cal on drums and Shannon on guitar, and daughter Ashley on banjo and keyboards as well as daughter Debby from a previous marriage. His eldest daughter Debby sang harmony. Prior to the tour, they played a show in Biloxi, Mississippi previewing the line-up. On September 15, 2011, Debby announced her departure from the band.

Set list
This set list is representative of the performance on June 24, 2012 in Los Angeles, California. It does not represent the set list at all concerts for the duration of the tour.

"Gentle on My Mind"
"Galveston"
"By the Time I Get to Phoenix"
"Try a Little Kindness"
"Where's the Playground Susie"
"Didn't We"
"I Can't Stop Loving You"
"True Grit"
"Lovesick Blues"
"Dueling Banjos"
"Digging Deep"
"Hey Little One"
"Any Trouble"
"It's Your Amazing Grace"
"The Moon Is a Harsh Mistress"
"Wichita Lineman"
"Rhinestone Cowboy"
Encore
"Southern Nights"
"A Better Place"

Tour dates

Cancelled concerts

Notes

References

2011 concert tours
2012 concert tours
Farewell concert tours